A referendum to approve the Évian Accords ending the Algerian War and granting self-determination to Algeria was held in France on 8 April 1962. It was approved by 90.8% of voters with a 75.3% turnout.

On 1 July a second referendum was held in Algeria, with the question "Do you want Algeria to become an independent state cooperating with France under the conditions defined by the 19 March 1962 declarations?" put to voters. Only people living in Algeria could participate in this referendum. This second referendum was approved by over 99.7% of voters.

Results

References

External links
Statement of the official results Constitutional Council 

1962 in France
Referendums in France
1962 referendums
1962 elections in France
1962 in international relations
Algerian War
Algeria–France relations
Independence referendums